The International Union of Railways (UIC) is an international rail transport industry body.

History 
The railways of Europe originated as many separate concerns, and there were many border changes after World War I and the Treaty of Versailles. Colonial railways were the responsibility of the mother country. Into this environment the UIC was created on 17 October 1922, with the aim of standardising industry practices.

Ticket revenue sharing was originally undertaken with the UIC Franc currency equivalent.  UIC classification and UIC Country Codes allowed precise determination of rolling stock capabilities and ownership, with wagons assigned unique UIC wagon numbers.  The 1990s GSM-R radio telecommunication system is an international interoperability specification covering voice and signalling systems for railway communications whose specification is maintained by the International Union of Railways project European Rail Traffic Management System (ERTMS).

Mission 
The UIC's mission is "to promote rail transport at world level and meet the challenges of mobility and sustainable development."

Objectives 
The UIC's main objectives are to:

 Facilitate the sharing of best practices among members (benchmarking)
 Support members in their efforts to develop new business and new areas of activities
 Propose new ways to improve technical and environmental performance
 Promote interoperability, create new world standards for railways (including common standards with other transport modes)
 Develop centres of competence (High Speed, Safety, Security, e-Business, ...)

Members 
When founded in 1922 the UIC had 51 members from 29 countries, including Japan and China. They were soon joined by members from the Soviet Union, the Middle East and North Africa. As of 2021, the UIC has 207 members across five continents. Of these there are:
 73 active members (including from Afghanistan, China, Europe, India, Japan, Kazakhstan, South Korea, the Middle East, North Africa, Pakistan, Russia, South Africa and Taiwan, and companies operating worldwide such as Transdev)
 68 associate members (including from Africa, the Americas, Asia and Australia)
 53 affiliate members (related or ancillary businesses or services)

On 12 November 2010, the UIC opened an African regional office in Tunis, Tunisia with the support of SNCFT.

On 9 March 2022, the UIC suspended all member companies from Russia and Belarus, following 2022 Russian invasion of Ukraine.

Standard terminology 
In order to provide a common understanding and reduce potential confusion, the UIC has established standard international railway terminology and a trilingual (English-French-German) thesaurus of terms. The thesaurus was the result of cooperation with the European Conference of Ministers of Transport (ECMT/) and was published in 1995.

Classification of railway vehicles 

The UIC has established systems for the classification of locomotives and their axle arrangements, coaches and goods wagons.

Some UIC regulations 
UIC plays an important role in standardization of railway parts, data and terminology. Therefore, UIC codes (also known as UIC leaflet) are developed since the beginning of UIC's work. A new term for these UIC leaflets is used by UIC for better understanding: International Railway Solution (IRS).

Some UIC codes are:

 UIC 568 The 13-corded standardized connection cable with connector is used to transmit data and commands between the locomotive and the carriages of a passenger train.
 UIC 592-2 Large containers for transport on wagons - Technical conditions to be fulfilled by large containers accepted for use in international traffic. Describes the classes and categories of large containers, handling characteristics, identification markings, and special conditions applying to large tank containers.
 UIC 592-3 Large containers (CT), swap bodies (CM) and transport frames for horizontal transhipment (CA) - Standard report on acceptance tests.
 UIC 592-4 Swap bodies for grab handling and spreader gripping - Technical conditions. Swap bodies are the removable superstructures of road transport vehicles. Their dimensions and some of their fittings are standardised, particularly dimensions, strength parameters and securing devices, of the road vehicle, the wagon and transhipment arrangements (grab-handling grooves, lower securing parts and, in special cases, upper securing parts).
 UIC 596-5 Transport of road vehicles on wagons - Technical organisation - Conveyance of semi-trailers with P coding or N coding on recess wagons. This leaflet sets out regulations and provisions for semi-trailers with normal road transport characteristics for conveyance on fixed-recess carrier wagons. The provisions are valid for semi-trailers, gantry equipment/industrial trucks with grab handles, recess wagon types 1a and 1b in accordance with UIC Leaflet 571–4.
 UIC 596-6 Conveyance of road vehicles on wagons - Technical organisation - Conditions for coding combined-transport load units and combined-transport lines. The leaflet sets out the coding and organisation of loading units in respect of road vehicles on wagons, designed to ensure compatibility of loading units (LU) with the permissible profile for combined transport lines. The provisions aim to facilitate LU identification to speed-up international traffic movements. They are applicable to semi-trailers, swap bodies, roller units loaded on wagons and bogies in combined transport operations.
FU-7100 Future Railway Mobile Communication System (FRMCS) User Requirements Specification.  Defines a set of technology independent user requirements in the form of individual applications.  Each application has been defined to provide or support an identified communications need that is considered necessary for current and future railway operation.

See also 
 African Union of Railways, similar organisation focused on Africa
 Association of American Railroads
 Intergovernmental Organisation for International Carriage by Rail
 International Union of Public Transport, (UITP) which covers passenger railways, especially in cities.
 Organization for Cooperation of Railways (OSShD) focused on Eastern Europe and Central Asia
 Community of Metros
 MERITS, integrated European timetable database

References

External links 
 Official website
 UIC Member list

 
Organizations established in 1922
Railway associations
International transport organizations